Ajuga turkestanica is a herbaceous flowering plant native to Central Asia. It was first described in 1894.

Description
A. turkestanica is a perennial herbaceous plant reaching heights between 40 and 60 cm. The plant is typically found in populations between 10 and 300, and appear more frequent within Artemisia complexes. The leaves are an elliptical oblong shape, straight-edged and with a pointed tip. It will flower between May and June. The flowers are small, pink, and located within the axil of two leaves. The fruit consists of four nuts, a characteristic of the Lamiaceae family. Fruit is born by the end of May.

Distribution
A. turkestanica is native to the Pamir-Alay mountain ranges of Central Asia, notably within the Surxondaryo Region of Uzbekistan. The species has also been observed within the low mountain regions of southern Tajikistan. It grows in rocky clay conditions up to elevations of approximately 2500 metres.

Uses
A. turkestanica, alongside many other Ajuga species, is claimed to have medicinal effects. The species has traditionally been used by local charmers (herbalists), who prescribe the herb as a tonic. Today, many bodybuilding supplements containing extracts of A. turkestanica can be found on the Internet. A. turkestanica contains ecdysteroid derivatives such as turkesterone, though whether these produce anabolic effects in mammals is unclear and research has shown inconsistent results.

References 

turkestanica
Flora of Asia
Garden plants of Asia
Plants described in 1894